Frederick John Dixon (January 20, 1881 – March 18, 1931) was a Manitoba politician, and was for several years the dominant figure in the province's mainstream labour and Henry George Single Tax Georgist movements. Also a proponent of proportional representation, he served as MLA in the Manitoba Legislature from 1914 to 1923.

Biography
Born in 1881 at Englefield in the English county of Berkshire, Dixon was influenced by the reformist labour politics of his home country, and also favoured the single tax ideas of Henry George.

He apprenticed as a gardener in England.

Dixon arrived in Manitoba in 1903, settling in Winnipeg. He apprenticed as a draftsman and worked as an engraver.

He became a member of the Independent Labour Party He opposed the efforts of some party members to declare the ILP as socialist and have it endorse widespread nationalization. This controversy led to the disintegration of the ILP in 1908. Dixon also wrote a weekly column in the Winnipeg labour weekly The Voice.

Dixon and his friend Seymour Farmer, later mayor of Winnipeg, moved their involvement to the League for Taxation of Land Values (the Single Tax programme) and the League for Direct Legislation, under which people would have the right of referendum, initiative and recall.

Dixon first ran for the provincial legislature in the 1910 provincial election as a candidate of the Manitoba Labour Party in Winnipeg Centre.  He was also supported by the provincial Liberal Party, whose platform he generally supported.  Dixon's centrist labourism brought about opposition from the Socialist Party of Canada, which ran a spoiler candidate against him. Dixon lost to Conservative Thomas Taylor by 73 votes; the SPC polled 99.

After the defeat, he again devoted himself to the cause of Direct Legislation,  He was a respected speaker for the Direct Legislation League. He moved to Moose Jaw and worked for the Saskatchewan Direct Legislation League.

In 1914, he married Winona Margaret Flett, a suffragist.

The SPC's actions provoked a backlash among Winnipeg trade unionists. That and his high profile among farmers due to his Direct Legislation League work increased his popularity.  He ran as an independent in the provincial election of 1914, in one of the two separate elections held in Winnipeg Centre. He received support from both the Liberals and the Labour Representation Committee (a successor to the MLP).  His platform included home rule for Winnipeg, women's suffrage, public ownership of utilities, removal of subsidies for private enterprise (including lowering the tariff walls to imported manufactured goods) and a referendum on temperance. Despite SPC and Conservative opposition, he took a majority of the votes and was elected for Winnipeg Centre "B".

In the Legislative Assembly, Dixon helped force an investigation into corruption associated with the construction of new Manitoba legislative buildings. This led to the downfall of the Robson government in 1915.

He was re-elected in the 1915 election, as an "Independent Progressive".

During World War I, Dixon emerged as one of the leading anti-conscriptionists in Winnipeg, and he defended the rights of conscientious objectors to the war effort.  These efforts placed him in conflict with the Manitoba Liberals, who generally supported the conscription policies of Robert Borden's Unionist government.

In March 1918, Dixon helped to found the first branch of the Dominion Labour Party in Winnipeg and served as its first president.  It was never a strong or centralized party but did pioneer the way to more developed leftist parties such as the CCF. The DLP subsequently branched out to other cities in the Canadian prairies.

Dixon supported the strikers during the Winnipeg General Strike of 1919. He undoubtedly played an important role in legitimizing their efforts among the city's reformist labourites.  After the editors of the Strike Bulletin were arrested, he published the Western Star and Enlightener. Dixon was subsequently arrested and charged with seditious libel for his statements in those publications. He defended himself in court and was found not guilty.

In the provincial election of 1920, Dixon headed a united labour list in the city of Winnipeg, which had been re-designed as a single constituency with ten members elected by single transferable voting.  He easily topped the poll with 11,586 votes, almost 7000 more than his nearest Liberal competitor.  There can be little doubt that Dixon was the most popular politician in the city at the time. His vote total was more than the quota required to win a seat and he was the first to be declared elected, his surplus votes then being transferred to other candidates.

In Winnipeg, Dixon and another DLP candidate Rev. Ivens were elected alongside four Liberals, 2 Conservatives, a Social Democratic Party candidate and a Socialist Party of Canada candidate.

Nine DLP MLAs, along with one member apiece from the SPC and SDPC, were elected to the Manitoba legislature in 1920.  Dixon was the unquestioned leader of the labour parliamentary caucus.  He cooperated with more left-wing figures, and kept the group reasonably united through to the election of 1922, although having to found a new party to do so.

In late 1920, the DLP in Winnipeg was taken over by rightist labourites who had opposed the General Strike.  Dixon led a walkout of DLP members, and was involved in founding the province's new Independent Labour Party.  The ILP became the primary voice of the parliamentary left in Manitoba, and later become part of the Cooperative Commonwealth Federation.

Dixon again topped the Winnipeg list in 1922, albeit by the reduced margin of almost 4000 votes over the nearest Liberal.  The total labour caucus was reduced to six members, although Ivens and Dixon were both re-elected.

In 1923, Dixon resigned as a Member of the Legislative Assembly following the death of his wife and two of his children.

John Queen, formerly of the SDPC, became ILP leader in his place.

Dixon spent the next few years working as a part-time insurance salesman.

He co-authored "Seasonal Unemployment in Manitoba, A Report", in 1928.

He died of cancer at the age of fifty, in 1931.

The tragedies of the last years of his life robbed Canada's labour movement of one of its most dynamic voices.

References

External links
 

1881 births
1931 deaths
Independent Labour Party (Manitoba, 1920) MLAs
Georgist politicians
People from Englefield, Berkshire
People of the Winnipeg general strike
English emigrants to Canada